Roderic Stanley (Stan) Dallas,  (30 July 1891 – 1 June 1918) was an Australian fighter ace of World War I. His score of aerial victories is generally regarded as the second-highest by an Australian, after Robert Little, but there is considerable dispute over Dallas's exact total. Though his official score is commonly given as 39, claim-by-claim analyses list as few as 32, and other research credits him with over 50, compared to Little's official tally of 47. Like Little, Dallas flew with British units, rather than the Australian Flying Corps. Beyond his personal combat record, Dallas achieved success as a squadron leader, both in the air and on the ground. He was also an influential tactician and test pilot. His service spanned almost the entirety of World War I fighter aviation.

Born on a remote property in rural Queensland, Dallas showed an early interest in aviation. He travelled to England at his own expense following the outbreak of World War I and became a pilot in the Royal Naval Air Service (RNAS) in August 1915. Initially seeing action with No. 1 Naval Wing on the Western Front in Caudrons and Nieuport 11s, he was chosen to test one of the earliest Sopwith Triplanes. This became his favourite type, and he achieved many victories with it through 1916–17, earning the Distinguished Service Order, and the Distinguished Service Cross and Bar. He was appointed commanding officer of No. 1 Squadron RNAS in June 1917. On the establishment of the Royal Air Force on 1 April 1918, he took command of No. 40 Squadron. Flying Royal Aircraft Factory S.E.5s, he achieved further victories before being killed in action on 1 June 1918 while on patrol near Liévin in northern France. He was buried in Pernes.

Early life
Stan Dallas was born on 30 July 1891 at Mount Stanley station outside Esk, Queensland, to labourer Peter MacArthur Dallas and his wife Honora. Mount Stanley was an isolated property, and journeys to and from Esk were long and infrequent; Stan was the first Caucasian child born at the station. His family moved to Tenterfield, New South Wales, soon after the birth of his younger brother in 1893. They returned to Queensland in 1898, settling in Mount Morgan, where Peter Dallas became a shift boss at the local mines. Stan attended Mount Morgan Boys' School from February 1899 and eventually joined its cadet corps, rising to sergeant.  At school he was noted for his intelligence, ability to get along well with others, and quiet sense of humour. He enjoyed the outdoors, and spent many hours in the mountains behind his family's home, observing birds of prey.

In July 1907, Dallas joined the assay office of the Mount Morgan Gold Mining Company, and also enrolled in the local technical college, where he took night classes in chemistry and technical drawing. He showed an early interest in aviation, fuelled by the establishment in 1911 of the Mount Morgan chapter of the Queensland Aero Club. Dallas and his younger brother Norvel built a glider, which was wrecked by an untimely gust of wind the first time they tried to launch it. The two brothers continued to build model gliders in spite of this initial disaster, and Stan corresponded with pioneer aviators in France, England, and the United States. He later transferred to a higher-paying job driving trucks for Iron Island ironstone quarries. Stan and Norvel once again built their own flying machine while Stan was working on Iron Island. They experimented with this seaplane on nearby Marble Island, notorious for its treacherous waters; Stan lost this aeroplane in the sea.

Despite his size, he was considered a fine athlete with quick reflexes. Although he could project a loud speaking voice, he was generally soft-spoken and was not known to curse or drink alcohol, nor often to smoke. Dallas stayed fit through regular exercise at the gym, and played rugby union football. He had exceptionally keen eyesight, which he had trained by reading small print in newspapers at the six-foot length of his family's table. To balance out athletics, he participated in amateur theatrics, where his strong voice served him well.

Service history

Rise to flying ace

Dallas joined the Port Curtis Militia in 1913, and was commissioned as a lieutenant before the outbreak of World War I. Believing he had little chance of gaining a place in the recently established Australian Flying Corps, he applied to join the British Royal Flying Corps (RFC), but was rejected. Undaunted, he travelled from Queensland to Melbourne, where he impressed Minister Without Portfolio J.A. Jensen. Jensen gave the young aspirant a letter of introduction to the Australian High Commissioner in London, Sir George Reid. Dallas paid his own passage to England and, once there, applied once more to the RFC. Rejected again, he turned to the Royal Naval Air Service (RNAS) and was accepted, topping the entrance examination over 83 other students. He was commissioned a flight sub-lieutenant and began training at Hendon in June 1915, gaining Pilot's License #1512 on 5 August.

On 3 December 1915, Dallas joined No. 1 Naval Wing and began flying combat missions in single-seat Nieuport 11 fighters and two-seat Caudrons out of Dunkirk, France. Early in his career there, a practical joker imitating the commanding officer telephoned Dallas, who was the duty officer, and peremptorily ordered him to take off in a propellerless Breguet. Upon learning that he had been tricked, Dallas joined in the laughter. He not only accepted the resulting nickname of "Breguet", but also used it as a signature on his letters home later in the war. Having made two unconfirmed claims in February 1916, Dallas scored his first confirmed victory on 23 April. He outmaneuvered a German Aviatik C and shot it out of control, following his victim down to 2,000 feet, though heavy anti-aircraft fire holed his plane in several places. He went on to score three more confirmed victories with his Nieuport.

On 23 June 1916, Dallas took delivery of the newest RNAS fighter, Sopwith Triplane #N500. This was the original prototype, having undergone Admiralty trials before being shipped to France. Though still only a test plane, it was flown into combat 15 minutes after its arrival. Dallas named it Brown Bread, and it was the first of a series of 'Tripes' that he would fly and fight in over the next year. He achieved his first victory with Brown Bread on 1 July, the same day he was promoted to flight lieutenant. Three days later, he was recommended for further promotion. He scored his last Nieuport-mounted 'kill' on 9 July, earning the Croix de guerre and a mention in despatches for coming to the aid of a French Maurice Farman biplane. On 7 September 1916, Dallas was awarded the Distinguished Service Cross, "for the specially gallant manner in which he has carried out his duties" since first seeing action in December 1915. By the end of the year he was among the earliest RNAS aces, with eight confirmed and four unconfirmed victories, and had been raised to the rank of flight commander.

Dallas became one of the best-known pilots of Sopwith Triplanes in the RNAS. He opened 1917 by setting an altitude record of 26,000 feet in the Triplane while testing a prototype oxygen set; he endured frostbite and oxygen intoxication in the process. By now No. 1 Wing's fighter squadron had been renumbered as No. 1 Squadron RNAS, and had totally re-equipped with production Triplanes. It also shifted airfields from Veurne in Belgium to Chipilly in France, leaving behind RNAS control by transferring to No. 14 Wing, 4th Brigade of the RFC. Formation flying became the order of the day, as the practice of fighter pilots soloing into combat dwindled. The last three weeks of March were also filled with Dallas's responsibilities for flight and gunnery testing. As British losses in the air began to mount during Bloody April, Dallas and his squadron moved airfields once again, to La Bellevue. They were thus positioned to take a prominent part in the subsequent Battle of Arras, where the intense aerial fighting saw Dallas add to his burgeoning score.

The combat of 23 April 1917 became known as one of the classic air battles of the war. Dallas and his wingman Thomas Culling took on a squadron-sized formation of 14 German aircraft, having gained an altitude edge over their foes. The naval aces exploited this edge by making quick diving attacks from opposite sides, culminating in short bursts of machine-gun fire. Using the Triplane's superior climbing ability, they would then bob back up to position themselves for the next assault. In contrast to the usual hit-and-run tactics of most dogfights, the RNAS duo launched at least 20 gunnery runs over 45 minutes. The Germans were forced progressively lower, into disarray, and then chased back over their own lines. As well as shooting down three of the Germans, Dallas and Culling achieved a more important outcome by blocking and then breaking up a determined enemy effort against the British ground offensive. The action led to the award of a Bar to the Distinguished Service Cross for Dallas, and a Distinguished Service Cross for Culling, which were gazetted on 29 June.

Squadron command

By June 1917, Dallas had achieved over 20 victories in aerial combat. This experience, and his leadership ability, led to his appointment as commanding officer of No. 1 Naval Squadron on 23 June 1917. The unit had been forced to cut back its operational strength from 18 aircraft to 15 due to lack of pilot replacements and a shortage of spare parts for the aging Triplanes. It had also moved airfields, to an unprepared site at Bailleul. As a leader, Dallas made a point of shepherding new pilots through their first flights, and even setting them up with their first victories by manoeuvring enemy aircraft into a good position for the rookie to take a shot.  On the ground, he proved to be an efficient organiser, designing and directing construction of the new air base. It was also during this time that he wrote a treatise on air combat tactics, extracts of which have survived. Both the air base layout and the treatise displayed his talent as a sketch artist. On 2 November, No. 1 Squadron moved airfields once more, to Middle Aerodrome, which put it back under overall RNAS control. The unit received its first eight new Sopwith Camels on 9 November as replacements for the Triplanes. On 11 November, Dallas was again mentioned in despatches, this time by Field Marshal Haig. After gaining its full complement of Camels, No. 1 Squadron was transferred to England, and took up home defence duties at Dover. On 16 February 1918, Dallas led his squadron back to France, where it was based at Téteghem, supporting units on operations along the Belgian coast. He commanded it for another six weeks, until 31 March.

As part of the amalgamation of the RFC and RNAS to form the Royal Air Force, on 1 April 1918 Dallas was promoted to major and given command of No. 40 Squadron RAF, flying Royal Aircraft Factory S.E.5s. The squadron boasted several aces in its ranks, and its former RFC members were suspicious of Dallas's naval background. He was nevertheless able to overcome their misgivings and established himself as the new CO with his personal demeanour and courage; the nickname of "Admiral" that they bestowed upon him was an affectionate one. Ten days after taking over, he had adapted well enough to his new mount with its inline engine to score his first victory with his new unit. His men also saw that he would not only look out for his rookie pilots, but would not shirk the dangers of ground attack sorties. His offhand attitude toward two leg wounds he received during a strafing mission on 14 April, after which he made "a perfect landing", especially impressed his subordinates, as did his appreciation of all ranks for their hard work. His studious bent continued to serve him; he kept notes on his methods of attacking enemy aircraft, which often exploited their structural weaknesses, and used them to tutor pilots under his command.

Dallas was briefly hospitalised with the wounds to his thigh and heel on 14 April, but sneaked out four days later to rejoin his squadron. His departure may have been spurred by news of the capture of his friend Richard Minifie. As soon as he was able, Dallas was flying again. By 26 April, he had increased his official score to 37, and been awarded the Distinguished Service Order for operations at Dunkirk. He had also several times been recommended for the Victoria Cross, but it was never approved. His casual attitude towards claiming victories was noted by a member of No. 40 Squadron, Cecil Usher, who related that Dallas once remarked of an opponent, "...he went down belching a lot of black smoke and after he had gone down someways one of his planes came off, but I didn't see him crash so I shan't claim him."

On 2 May 1918, during a lull in the fighting at Flanders, Dallas took off in his S.E.5 to taunt his foes. He strafed the German base at La Brayelle to "attract attention" before dropping a package on the aerodrome with a note reading, "If you won't come up here and fight, herewith a pair of boots for work on the ground, pilots for the use of". He then circled in mist until troops came to examine the bundle, whereupon he dropped two bombs and again shot up the base, causing "general panic". News of this singular exploit reportedly provoked laughter from Field Marshal Haig and RAF founder General Sir Hugh Trenchard, two men not known for their sense of humour. While adding to his score and leading his squadron into combat, Dallas had begun thinking beyond the war. He was pleading with his father to quit the dangerous job of mining, with hints that he would support his parents by pioneering aviation in Australia.  He also harboured a long-standing ambition of flying from England back to Australia, which would be a record-setting journey.

Death and legacy

Dallas was raised to lieutenant colonel and appointed to the command of a wing, but would never see the message from headquarters that arrived on 1 June 1918 advising him of the promotion and ordering him to cease flying. He disappeared on a solo mission the same day. It was later learned that he had been killed over Liévin during combat with three Fokker Triplanes from Jagdstaffel 14, probably by its commander, Leutnant Johannes Werner. There are several theories as to how he died. The common elements are that he was on patrol near the front line when he pounced on a German plane flying at a lower level, that there might have been another unknown British pilot in trouble, and that the Germans who shot Dallas down had dived from a still higher altitude. Medics near his crash site at Absalom Trench ventured into no man's land and retrieved his body, and a patrol of eight volunteers salvaged his personal effects from the fallen aircraft. News of Dallas's death was greeted with shock and disbelief by his squadron, one pilot recording:

The British magazine Aeroplane later paid tribute to him in an editorial:

For his record in aerial combat and his leadership skills, Dallas has been compared to the "Red Baron", Manfred von Richthofen. The former flew combat for 29 months, and the latter for 31 months, if his three months in hospital are deducted. Dallas successfully led two different squadrons during his career, and was killed just before assuming command of a wing. Richthofen led first a squadron, then a wing during his 12 months in command, again excluding hospital time; he achieved more victories, but had the tactical advantage of fighting over his own lines with the wind in his favour. Dallas flew a score of different types of Allied aircraft, as well as captured German planes; he was also instrumental in developing the Sopwith Triplane. Richthofen flew the Fokker Dr.1, and helped develop the Fokker D.VII, but did not live to fly it into battle.

Stan Dallas was buried at the Pernes British Cemetery, France, in Lot 38, Row E of Plot II. Along with his military decorations, he was honoured with a Gold Medal by the Aéro-Club de France, and a Bronze Medal and Diploma by the Aero Club of America. The national capital of Canberra remembered him with Dallas Place. His home town of Mount Morgan has dedicated a water reservoir in his honour; its Historical Society Museum holds his medals, uniform, and sword, as well the propeller from one of his planes.

List of victories
Historians have struggled to develop a definitive list of Dallas's victories; Adrian Hellwig, in the bibliography to his 2006 biography, lists over a dozen previous historians that have investigated the subject. He also refers to his difficulties in reconciling previous accounts. Several claim-by-claim analyses ascribe Dallas a score of 32 aircraft shot down, but he was officially credited with 39, and with being second only to Robert Little—who was credited with 47—among Australian aces.  Dallas's unofficial tally has been estimated at over 50. This list is a compilation of claim-by-claim analyses that follow, as much as possible, the British system of confirming victory: pilot log entries and/or combat reports did not count, unless verified by squadron or higher levels of command. Thus, inclusion of a confirmed victory in this list has depended on verification by the Squadron Record Book, and/or by RNAS/RAF Communique or other reliable secondary source verification. Victories not confirmed by these methods are marked "u/c".

Notes

References

 
 
 
 
 
 
 
 
 
 
 
 

1891 births
1918 deaths
Burials in France
Military personnel from Queensland
Australian Army officers
Australian aviators
Australian World War I flying aces
Aviators killed by being shot down
British military personnel killed in World War I
Companions of the Distinguished Service Order
Recipients of the Croix de Guerre 1914–1918 (France)
Recipients of the Distinguished Service Cross (United Kingdom)
Royal Air Force officers
Royal Air Force personnel of World War I
Royal Naval Air Service aviators
Royal Naval Air Service personnel of World War I
Australian aviation record holders